Fort Dolorès (French: Fort-Dolorès) is a 1939 French western film directed by René Le Hénaff and starring Roger Karl, Gina Manès and Pierre Larquey.

The film's sets were designed by the art director Aimé Bazin.

Cast
 Roger Karl as Don Ramirez de Avila
 Gina Manès as Lola
 Pierre Larquey as Jefke Vandenbom, le Belge 
 Paul Escoffier as Pasquale
 Paul Asselin as Malcolm Trubbles
 Arthur Devère as le général
 Philippe Hersent as Marco Lopez
 Teddy Michaud as Enrique Benitero
 Charles Moulin as Angelo Pastor
 Alexandre Rignault as Cesare Rossi
 Maurice Rémy as Walter Knoppendorf
 Georges Sellier as Carlos Orgaz
 Georges Tourreil as Juan, le prêtre
 Alina de Silva as Consuelo
 Robert Guilbert as Domingo Lapar
 Henry Roger as Martial Vandeuil
 Joe Alex
 Gaby Andreu
 Paul Asselin
 Robert Bassac
 Marfa Dhervilly
 Henri Nassiet
 Annie France
 Ariane Anda
 Flavia Escola
 Géo Lecomte
 Monique Montey
 Charles Redgie

References

Bibliography 
 Crisp, C.G. Genre, Myth, and Convention in the French Cinema, 1929-1939. Indiana University Press, 2002.

External links 
 

1939 films
French Western (genre) films
1939 Western (genre) films
1930s French-language films
Films directed by René Le Hénaff
French black-and-white films
1930s French films